Lucky the Man is the 2001 studio album by the British folk guitarist, singer and songwriter Wizz Jones. The album was re-released on CD in 2007, with additional tracks, on the Hux label; this issue comes with a 12-page booklet including extensive notes, personal comments from Wizz on each of the bonus tracks, plus rare photographs from Jones' personal archive.

Track listing
"Weeping Willow Blues" (Blind Boy Fuller)
"Sermonette" (Nat and Julian Adderley)
"Lucky the Man" (Wizz Jones)
"Paris" (Clive Palmer; arranged by Wizz Jones)
"Omie Wise "(Traditional; arranged by Wizz Jones)
"Mountain Rain" (Archie Fisher)
"In Stormy Weather" (Al Jones)
"Another Summertime" (Wizz Jones)
"Lullaby of Battersea" (Wizz Jones)
"Roving Cowboy (Ballad of Dan Moody)" (Mike Smith)
"Funny (But I Still Love You)" (Ray Charles)
"Blues Run the Game" (Jackson C. Frank)
"Would You Like to Take a Walk?" (Mort Dixon, Billy Rode, Harry Warren)

Additional tracks on 2007 CD release

"About a Spoonful" (Mance Lipscomb)
"Dark Eyed Gypsies" (Traditional; arranged by Wizz Jones)
"Moving On Song" (Ewan MacColl)
"Planet Without a Plan" (Wizz Jones)
"Sugar for Sugar" (Richard "Rabbit" Brown)

Personnel
Wizz Jones - acoustic guitar, lead vocals
John Renbourn - guitar, vocals
Clive Palmer - 5-string banjo
Jacqui McShee - vocals
Gary Ricard - Godin electric guitar, vocals
Gerry Conway - percussion
Bernd Rest - Santa Cruz acoustic guitar
Simeon Jones - harmonica, tenor saxophone
Martin Wheatley - National Tricone tenor guitar, Martin mahogany ukulele
Ramblin' Jack Elliott - guitar, vocals (2007 issue only)

Label details

2001 issue
Label       = Scenescof (USA)
Catalogue # = SCOFCD1009 (CD); SCOFLP1009 (limited edition vinyl LP)

2007 issue
 Label: Hux Records
 Catalogue # = HUX094
 ASIN: B000UUHOCW

Production
Producers: Wizz Jones, Andy le Vien, Charles Reynolds
Recording Engineer: Andy le Vien
Mixing: unknown
Photography: Dave Peabody, Robert Wilbraham, Charles Reynolds, Simeon Jones
Liner Notes: unknown

Wizz Jones albums
2001 albums